Coryphista is a monotypic moth genus in the family Geometridae erected by George Duryea Hulst in 1896. The genus may be considered to be a synonym of Rheumaptera. Its only species, Coryphista meadii, the barberry geometer moth or barberry looper, was first described by Alpheus Spring Packard in 1874. It is found in the United States and southern Canada.

The wingspan is 30–36 mm. There are two forms. The typical form is dark brown, while form C. badiaria has orangish-brown antemedial and subterminal bands. The hindwings are pale grayish brown with variably distinct lines and a toothed/wavy margin.

Adults are on wing from April to October. There are several generations per year.

The larvae feed on Berberis species (barberries), an introduced shrub in most of eastern North America.

References

External links

Rheumapterini
Monotypic moth genera